The 1946 United States Senate election in Missouri was held on November 5, 1946. 

Incumbent Democratic Senator Frank P. Briggs, who was appointed to fill the vacancy left by Vice President Harry S. Truman, ran for re-election to a full term in office, but was defeated by Republican James Kem.

Democratic primary

Candidates
 Frank P. Briggs, incumbent Senator since 1945
Marvin Casteel
James Patrick Quinn
Robert I. Young, perennial candidate

Results

Republican primary

Candidates
William P. Elmer, U.S. Representative from Salem
 Herman G. Grosby
 James P. Kem, corporate attorney and Chairman of the Jackson County Republican Committee
 Ray Mabee, former State Senator from Unionville
 William McKinley Thomas, perennial candidate

Results

General election

Results

See also 
 1946 United States Senate elections

References 

1946
Missouri
United States Senate